Bovine papular stomatitis is a farmyard pox caused by Bovine papular stomatitis virus (BPSV), which can spread from infected cattle to cause disease in milkers, farmers and veterinarians. Generally there is usually one or a few skin lesions typically on the hands or forearm. The disease is generally mild.

BPSV is a member of the family Poxviridae and the genus Parapoxvirus. Spread typically occurs by direct contact with the infected animal, but has been reported in people without direct contact.

It may appear similar to foot-and-mouth disease.

It occurs worldwide in cattle.

In other animals the lesions are reddish, raised, sometimes ulcerative lesions on the lips, muzzle, and in the mouth. It usually occurs before the age of two years.

References 

Bovine diseases
Chordopoxvirinae
Animal viral diseases
Virus-related cutaneous conditions